The 1998 Montreal Alouettes finished in second place in the East Division with a 12–5–1 record. The Hamilton Tiger-Cats finished with the same record, but won the season series and thus, the tie-breaker. Hamilton also defeated the Alouettes in the East Final, denying the team a trip to the Grey Cup. 

The 1998 season was significant with the signing of future all-time team passing leader Anthony Calvillo, the drafting of future Alouette touchdown leader Ben Cahoon, and longtime centre Bryan Chiu becoming a regular starter on the offensive line. Running back Mike Pringle became the first player to rush for over 2000 yards in a single season. The Alouettes also made a permanent move to Percival Molson Memorial Stadium on the campus of McGill University after dwindling attendance numbers at Olympic Stadium.

Offseason

CFL draft

Preseason

Regular season

Season Standings

Season Schedule

Roster

Playoffs

East Semi-Final

East Final

Awards

1998 CFL All-Star Selections
Uzooma Okeke – Offensive Tackle
Elfrid Payton – Defensive End
Mike Pringle – Running Back
Pierre Vercheval – Offensive Guard

1998 CFL Eastern All-Star Selections
Uzooma okeke – Offensive Tackle
Elfrid payton – Defensive End
Mike pringle – Running Back
Pierre vercheval – Offensive Guard

1998 Intergold CFLPA All-Star Selections

References

1998 Canadian Football League season by team
Montreal Alouettes seasons
1990s in Montreal
1998 in Quebec